Kristina Yosifovna Paul (born 22 February 1998) is a Russian snowboarder. She competed in the 2018 Winter Olympics.

At the 2019 World Championships, Paul was the only Russian to qualify to the quarterfinals. She competed at the 2022 Winter Olympics, in Women's snowboard cross.

References

1998 births
Living people
Snowboarders at the 2018 Winter Olympics
Snowboarders at the 2022 Winter Olympics
Russian female snowboarders
Olympic snowboarders of Russia
Universiade gold medalists for Russia
Universiade medalists in snowboarding
Competitors at the 2019 Winter Universiade
Snowboarders at the 2016 Winter Youth Olympics
People from Tashtagol
Sportspeople from Kemerovo Oblast